The 1960 Tour de Suisse was the 24th edition of the Tour de Suisse cycle race and was held from 16 June to 22 June 1960. The race started in Zürich and finished in Basel. The race was won by Alfred Rüegg of the Liberia team.

General classification

References

1960
Tour de Suisse